The Lakes South Morang P–college School (aka The Lakes) is situated in the Northern Suburbs of Melbourne, Australia and is part of a rapidly growing corridor in the City of Whittlesea. The school is a diverse community with a representative mix of many cultures, however there is no one dominant culture within the school. The School SFO index is .541 with approximately 25% of parents receiving EMA.

Campuses

Middle Years Campus
This site includes an administration area with a professional
development resource centre, 20 general purpose classroom spaces opening onto flexible,
common learning areas, an arts precinct, a gymnasium, performing arts spaces, food technology
and a canteen. The research and development precinct houses purpose-built science labs, a design
studio, dance studio and state-of-the-art technology facilities. Students participate in numerous events including an Egyptian Bazaar Night, Medieval Night, song  dance drama night, School Production, Billy Cart derby, and Enterprise day.

Early Years Campus
This site has an administration area, general purpose classrooms that
open onto flexible learning spaces, an art room, and a library. Merriang SDS -The Lakes campus will also be co-located on this site, sharing a recreation centre which includes a canteen, performing arts space, and multi-purpose area.

The school was designed to make much use of flexible learning spaces, outdoor s well as indoor learning spaces, and ICT capability throughout the buildings. The prep to 9 concept provides for seamless transition
between the Early Years and Middle Years models. Students in senior primary will also move into
the junior secondary years without having to adjust to a completely new environment.

Values
The stated values of the Lakes P-9 School are respect, leadership, learning, and teamwork

Staffing
A total of 60 teachers, 19 support staff and 3 district staff are educating and caring for 700 students. There is a ratio of 1 full-time teacher to every 14.2 students.

Support staff include office personnel, disability aides, library technicians, first aid, literacy aides, canteen manager, uniform shop manager, facilities maintenance, computer technicians, and language support personnel.

District staff include a psychologist, speech pathologist, school nurse, and visiting teacher service for the physically impaired.

1:1 Ipad Program
At the lakes you have the chance to have a school ipad until you leave the school. The ipads are required to bring to each class and are also used frequently.

The Lake
The Lake: a feathered tale of deception and dance is The Lakes' second major stage production. It is based on the story of 'Swan Lake'. Unlike the original, the music & dances performed in 'The Lake' are modern and appealed to younger audiences. The production ran on Thursday 2nd & Friday 3 September 2010. All 5 out of 7 songs are original compositions which were played by a live band on the nights. The songs were written by one of the music staff. The other two songs were 'Bleeding Love'  by Leona Lewis and 'Tainted Love' by The Pussycat Dolls.

Track listing
 "The Lake Overture" (Opening Scene)
 "Woods" (Woods Scene)
 "Tainted Love" by The Pussycat Dolls (Swan Scene)
 "Fire Love" (Love Scene)
 "Fight" (Fight Scene)
 "A Girl Like You" (Party Scene)
 "Bleeding Love" by Leona Lewis
 "Life Begins" (Death/Closing Scene)

The production was held at Parade College in Bundoora, Victoria, Australia.

Unskooled
Unskooled is a band of middle-years students who attend The Lakes P-9 School. The band started in 2008 and has released 2 EPs. It has performed at many events, including the NMR School Of Rock in 2008 and 2009, Doreen Primary School's Day On The Dirt, and Big Day Out Concerts and The City of Whittlesea Community Festival in 2008.

Discography

The band was suspended in March 2010 and permanently separated soon after.

References

Related links
 The Lakes Website
 Year Prep Blog
 Year 1/2 Blog
 Year 5/6 Blog
 Year 8 Blog
 'Student Times' Website
 Unskooled Website
 Schools within the City of Whittlesea

Public schools in Melbourne
Educational institutions established in 2007
2007 establishments in Australia